Events from the year 1944 in Taiwan, Empire of Japan.

Incumbents

Central government of Japan
 Prime Minister: Hideki Tōjō, Kuniaki Koiso

Taiwan
 Governor-General – Kiyoshi Hasegawa, Rikichi Andō

Births
 9 January – Wang Tuoh, Minister of Council for Cultural Affairs (2008).
 16 April – Lin Ling-san, Minister of Transportation and Communications (2002–2006).
 10 June – Tu Cheng-sheng, Minister of Economic Affairs (2004–2008).
 12 June – Chou Ching-yu, Magistrate of Changhua County (1989–1993).
 15 September – Huang Huang-hsiung, member of Legislative Yuan (1981–1984, 1987–1990, 1993–1996).

Deaths
 11 June – Teng Yu-hsien, 37, musician.

References

 
Years of the 20th century in Taiwan